Yanuar Tri Firmanda (born January 31, 1980 in Malang) is an Indonesian former footballer.

Club statistics

References

External links

1980 births
Association football goalkeepers
Living people
Javanese people
Indonesian footballers
Liga 1 (Indonesia) players
Persiba Balikpapan players
Deltras F.C. players
Indonesian Premier Division players
PSIR Rembang players
Persin Sinjai players
Sportspeople from Malang